"Talking in My Sleep" is a song by Swedish singer Paul Rey. The song was performed for the first time in Melodifestivalen 2020, where it made it to the final through the Second Chance round. The song ended up in sixth place, scoring a total of 68 points.

Track listing

Charts

Weekly charts

Year-end charts

Certifications

References

2020 singles
English-language Swedish songs
Melodifestivalen songs of 2020
Songs written by Lukas Hällgren
2020 songs